Brezje pri Rožnem Dolu is a small settlement in the Municipality of Semič in Slovenia. The municipality is included in the Southeast Slovenia Statistical Region. The entire area is part of the historical region of Lower Carniola.

Name
The name Brezje pri Rožnem Dolu means 'Brezje near Rožni Dol', distinguishing it from other settlements named Brezje. The name Brezje is shared with several other places in Slovenia and is derived from the word brezje 'birch grove', referring to the local vegetation.

References

External links
Brezje pri Rožnem Dolu at Geopedia

Populated places in the Municipality of Semič